"Broken Record" is a song performed by British singer Katy B and serves as the third single from her debut album, On a Mission. It was released in the United Kingdom on 25 March 2011 as a digital download. It charted at number 8 on the UK Singles Chart on 3 April 2011.

Critical reception
Robert Copsey of Digital Spy gave the song a positive review stating:

You could be forgiven for thinking Katy B is a bit of a hard nut - after all, she's already collaborated with hardened artistes of the garage/dubstep world Magnetic Man and Ms Dynami-tee-hee, both of whom you'd be a fool to mess with after a round of Red Stripes. However, one listen to her latest chart botherer and such fears simply melt away.

"I would toss and turn at night with your voice in my head," she confesses over a thumping garage beat reminiscent of late-'90s pop combined with a bang-on-trend D&B bassline. While the melody remains as grimey as her previous offerings, her vulnerable and grief-stricken vocal immediately softens the song's sharper edges, culminating in an achingly sad but sonically uplifting ending that Robyn would be proud to call her own. Hard nut? You don't fool us, Katy. .

Track listing

Charts

Weekly charts

Year-end charts

Release history

References 

Katy B songs
2011 singles
Songs written by Katy B
Songs written by DJ Zinc
Song recordings produced by DJ Zinc